John Joseph Ezersky (March 21, 1922 – February 20, 2012) was an American professional basketball player. A basketball star at Power Memorial Academy in the late 1930s, Ezersky was accused of accepting money in his senior year and was subsequently ruled ineligible for college basketball. Though Ezersky is listed as having played for the University of Rhode Island team, he never played basketball at a college level.

Ezersky attempted a career in baseball following his college basketball ruling and tried out for the Detroit Tigers alongside close friend Buddy Kerr in 1941, but he was sent to the minor leagues and failed to make it out of spring training.  He returned to New York, where he became a cab driver and was later drafted into the military for World War II. He was discharged from service in 1946, and resumed his cab driving before attempting to pursue a career in professional basketball.  He signed with the Brooklyn Gothams of the American Basketball League, but only managed to play two games for the team. The following season, he signed with the Tri-Cities Blackhawks of the National Basketball League, and played with the team for two months. Ezersky spent the next two seasons in the Basketball Association of America and, later, the National Basketball Association, playing with the Baltimore Bullets in two stints and the Boston Celtics in one, with the latter team having previously drafted him in the 1947 BAA draft. He was not resigned by either team following the 1949–50 NBA season, so he spent his final two seasons playing basketball in the ABL for a second time with the Hartford Hurricanes and Wilkes-Barre Barons, and in the Eastern Professional Basketball League with the Scranton Miners.

After retiring from playing professional basketball in 1952, Ezersky returned to his career as a cab driver in New York City. He moved to East Bay, California in 1981, where he resumed his cab driving career until he retired in 2000, aged seventy-eight. Ezersky was a member of the group of NBA veterans that lobbied against the NBA's pension rules, which previously required pre-1965 players to have played in the NBA or BAA for five years to be eligible. The requirement was changed to three years and made Ezersky, who spent three years in the two leagues, able to receive the pension.

BAA/NBA career statistics

Regular season

References

External links

1922 births
2012 deaths
American Basketball League (1925–1955) players
American men's basketball players
American military personnel of World War II
Baltimore Bullets (1944–1954) players
Boston Celtics draft picks
Boston Celtics players
Forwards (basketball)
Guards (basketball)
Providence Steamrollers players
Rhode Island Rams men's basketball players
Wilkes-Barre Barons players